Jonathan de Marte (born April 29, 1993) is an American-Israeli  professional baseball pitcher and pitches for Team Israel. He is 6-1 and weighs 205 lbs. As a high school player, he was a two-time New York State Gatorade Player of the Year. He played college baseball for the University of Richmond. In 2018, he became a dual Israeli citizen. He signed a minor league deal with the Chicago Cubs in 2020, but never pitched for the organization due to the Covid-19 pandemic. He plays for the Israel National Baseball Team, and pitched for Team Israel at the 2019 European Baseball Championship. He also pitched for the team at the Africa/Europe 2020 Olympic Qualification tournament in Italy in September 2019, which Israel won to qualify to play baseball at the 2020 Summer Olympics.  He pitched for Team Israel at the 2020 Summer Olympics in Tokyo in the summer of 2021.

Early and personal life
De Marte is son of Dorrie Derfler, a probation officer, and is Jewish. He had his bar mitzvah in Temple Beth Am in Yorktown Heights. His younger brother Matthew, one of his triplet siblings, is in the Los Angeles Angels’ scouting department. He grew up in Yorktown Heights, New York, 35 miles north of New York City. In October 2018 he became a dual Israeli citizen, partly to help Israel's baseball team make the 2020 Olympics.

High school
De Marte attended Lakeland High School in Yorktown Heights, New York, where as both a junior in 2010 and a senior in 2011 he was named the best high school baseball player in New York State, as the New York State Gatorade Player of the Year. He was also named the 2010 Louisville Slugger New York Player of the Year, a 2011 Louisville Slugger All-American, a two-time State Player of the Year by the New York Sportswriters, a two-time All-State pick, and a three-time All-Section and All-League honoree. As a senior he was 6-1 as a pitcher with a 1.22 ERA, and had 59 strikeouts and gave up five walks in 40 innings, while as a batter he hit .492 with 20 RBIs.

College
De Marte attended the University of Richmond, in Richmond, Virginia. In 2013, as a redshirt freshman pitcher, he was 5–0 with a 4.11 ERA. The following season, before joining the disabled list due to injury, he was 2–4 with a 9.97 ERA. He sat out 2015, and in 2016 he batted .319 in 17 games and played third base. In 2017, he was team captain and had a team-best 2.67 ERA and four saves as a relief pitcher, and as a hitter he batted .294 with a team-best five home runs. He was an Atlantic 10 All-Academic honoree. He received an undergraduate degree in Rhetoric and Communications, and a graduate degree in Human Resources Management.

Minor leagues
On June 22, 2017, de Marte signed with the Normal CornBelters of the Frontier League, for whom in 2017 he was 2–1 with a 5.53 ERA in 20 appearances, while striking out 36 batters in 27.2 innings.

Pitching for the CornBelters again in 2018, he was 3–4 with 7 saves (tied for 8th in the league) and a 2.87 ERA in 42 relief appearances (tied for 5th), while striking out 58 batters in 53.1 innings.

On September 6, 2018, de Marte signed with the York Revolution of the Atlantic League of Professional Baseball. He pitched five innings for the team in 2018, and was 0–0 with a 3.60 ERA, striking out five batters.

On March 6, 2019, he re-signed with the York Revolution, playing with it until May 10, and pitching 5.2 innings. In 2019 he also played for Les Capitales de Quebec of the Canadian-American Association, beginning pitching for it on May 17, with a record of 3-2 and five saves (7th in the league) and a 2.23 ERA, as in 40.1 innings over 35 games he gave up 27 hits and 15 walks while striking out 42 batters.

He signed a non-binding contract to play for the Perth Heat in the Australian Baseball League in the beginning of 2020.

On February 26, 2020, de Marte signed a minor league deal with the Chicago Cubs. On March 15, 2021, without him having had a chance to throw a pitch for the organization due to the Covid-19 pandemic, de Marte was released by the Cubs organization.

Team Israel

De Marte competed on the Israel national baseball team for qualification for the 2020 Olympics. He pitched in relief in two games as the team played in the 2019 European Baseball Championship - B-Pool in early July 2019 in Blagoevgrad, Bulgaria, winning all of its games and advancing to the playoffs against Team Lithuania in the 2019 Playoff Series at the end of July 2019 for the last qualifying spot for the 2019 European Baseball Championship. He was 2–0 with a 3.60 ERA, as in 5 innings he struck out 5 batters, with his two wins tying for tops in the tournament.

He pitched for Team Israel at the 2019 European Baseball Championship, going 1–0 with a 0.00 ERA as in three relief appearances he pitched 5 innings and gave up 4 hits and no walks as he struck out 8 batters, and was credited with the win against Team Germany. He also pitched for the team at the Africa/Europe 2020 Olympic Qualification tournament in Italy in September 2019, which Israel won to qualify to play baseball at the 2020 Summer Olympics in Tokyo. In the tournament he was 0–0 with a 0.00 ERA over 4.0 innings in which he had 7 strikeouts while giving up one hit and zero walks. 

In the Olympics, he was slated to be the team's closer. He pitched 1.1 innings over two games for Team Israel at the 2020 Summer Olympics in Tokyo in the summer of 2021.

References

External links 

1993 births
Living people
York Revolution players
Israeli American
Israeli baseball players
People from Yorktown Heights, New York
Richmond Spiders baseball players
Jewish American baseball players
Baseball pitchers
Baseball players from New York (state)
2019 European Baseball Championship players
Baseball players at the 2020 Summer Olympics
Normal CornBelters players
Québec Capitales players
Perth Heat players
New York Brave players
Minor league baseball players
Olympic baseball players of Israel
21st-century American Jews